This is a list of automobile models which are / or have been manufactured in Argentina.

Sources:

Current models

Discontinued models

Note: Some manufacturers who made models under license are not identified.

See also 
List of car models commercialized in Argentina

Notes

References 

Car models
Argentina
Automobiles
Cars of Argentina
Goods manufactured in Argentina
Manufacturing-related lists
Argentina
Automobiles